The Jerung-class is a class of gunboats in service with the Royal Malaysian Navy. The Jerong class is equipped only with Bofors 57 mm gun and Bofors 40 mm gun for close-in combat and fire support, unlike other fast attack crafts in Malaysian service which are armed with anti-ship missiles. Peacetime duties include patrol of the exclusive economic zone, interception of illegal immigrants and anti-piracy operations. They are too small and under-armed for use in conventional warfare or in open waters. In late 2020 Royal Malaysian Navy confirmed that this class of ship will be upgrade to lengthening service period of older ships.

Service history

Ships of the class

References

Gunboat classes
Naval ships of Malaysia